Mariano Augusto Mauri (born 4 August 1994) is an Argentine footballer who plays as a left-back for  Club Atlético Douglas Haig in 2022.

Career
Mauri's first career club was Unión Santa Fe, who he started appearing for professionally in 2014. He made two appearances during the 2013–14 Primera B Nacional campaign, though made his debut on 30 April in a Copa Argentina game with Juventud Unida Universitario. He made five subsequent appearances in 2014, a season which ended with promotion to the Argentine Primera División. On 15 May 2015, Cipolletti loaned Mauri. He scored his first career goal in his fourth match, on 7 June against General Belgrano. In total, Cipolletti selected Mauri in twenty-six fixtures and he netted two goals.

After returning to Unión Santa Fe, Mauri was loaned out once more in August 2016; to Sportivo Belgrano until June 2017. Twenty-six appearances followed throughout 2016–17. Fellow Torneo Federal A club Unión Sunchales temporarily signed Mauri upon his arrival back in Santa Fe. However, he left months later without featuring for their first-team. In early 2018, Mauri left Unión Santa Fe permanently to play in Torneo Federal C for Sanjustino. On 31 August, Mauri was signed by Atlético Paraná of Torneo Federal A. He scored four goals in one season, including one against ex-club Unión Sunchales.

A move to Chaco For Ever was completed in July 2019. However, Mauri left midway through the following season after not appearing competitively. He subsequently joined Americano de Carlos Pellegrini of Liga San Martín in January 2020.

Personal life
Mauri's father is Jorge Mauri, a former professional footballer.

Career statistics
.

References

External links

1994 births
Living people
Footballers from Santa Fe, Argentina
Argentine footballers
Association football defenders
Primera Nacional players
Argentine Primera División players
Torneo Federal A players
Unión de Santa Fe footballers
Club Cipolletti footballers
Sportivo Belgrano footballers
Unión de Sunchales footballers
Club Atlético Paraná players
Chaco For Ever footballers